Jalna may refer to:

India
Jalna (Lok Sabha constituency), a parliamentary constituency of Maharashtra
Jalna (Vidhan Sabha constituency), a parliamentary constituency of Maharashtra
Jalna, Maharashtra, a city and a municipal council in Jalna district
Jalna district, an administrative district in the state of Maharashtra in western India
Jalna railway station

Other uses
Jalna (film), a 1935 film adaptation of the novel directed by John Cromwell
Jalna (novel series), a 16 book series by Canadian author Mazo de la Roche
Jalna, a locality in Lac Ste. Anne County, Alberta, Canada

See also
Jalna, India (disambiguation)